The Courier-Mail is an Australian newspaper published in Brisbane. Owned by News Corp Australia, it is published daily from Monday to Saturday in tabloid format. Its editorial offices are located at Bowen Hills, in Brisbane's inner northern suburbs, and it is printed at Murarrie, in Brisbane's eastern suburbs. It is available for purchase throughout Queensland, most regions of Northern New South Wales and parts of the Northern Territory.

History
The history of The Courier-Mail is through four mastheads. The Moreton Bay Courier later became The Courier, then the Brisbane Courier and, since a merger with the Daily Mail in 1933, The Courier-Mail.

The Moreton Bay Courier was established as a weekly paper in June 1846. Issue frequency increased steadily to bi-weekly in January 1858, tri-weekly in December 1859, then daily under the editorship of Theophilus Parsons Pugh from 14 May 1861. The recognised founder and first editor was Arthur Sidney Lyon (1817–1861) who was assisted by its printer, James Swan (1811–1891), the later mayor of Brisbane and member of Queensland Legislative Council. Lyon, also referred to as the "father of the Press" in the colony of Queensland, had previously served as a writer and journalist in Melbourne, and later moved on to found and edit journals such as Moreton Bay Free Press, North Australian and Darling Downs Gazette. Lyon was encouraged to emigrate by Rev. Dr. John Dunmore Lang and arrived in Brisbane from Sydney in early 1846 to establish a newspaper. He persuaded James Swan, a printer of Lang's Sydney newspaper The Colonialist to join him. Lyon and Swan established themselves on the corner of Queen Street and Albert Street, Brisbane, in a garret of a building later known as the North Star Hotel. The first issue of the Moreton Bay Courier, consisting of 4 pages, appeared weekly on Saturday 20 June 1846, with Lyon as editor and Swan as publisher.

After some 18 months, Lyon and Swan disagreed on many aspects of editorial policy, including transportation of convicts and squatting. Lyon took over sole control in late 1847, but had money problems, and gave sole control to Swan. Swan sold out to Thomas Blacket Stephens in about November 1859.The Moreton Bay Courier became The Courier, and then the Brisbane Courier in 1864.  In June–July 1868, Stephens floated a new company, and transferred the plant and copyright of the Brisbane Courier to "The Brisbane Newspaper Company". He was the managing director until retired in November 1873, when the paper was auctioned.

The Journal was, from November 1873 to December 1880, managed by one of the new part owners, the Tasmanian-born former public servant Gresley Lukin (1840–1916). Although called 'managing editor', actual writing and editing was by William Augustine O'Carroll (1831–1885). Most prominent of the various editors and sub-editors of the Queenslander 'literary staff' were William Henry Traill (1842–1902), later NSW politician and editor of the famed Sydney journal 'The Bulletin', and Carl Adolph Feilberg (1844–1887), who was Danish born but from the age of six educated in England and later in France. Carl Feilberg followed William Henry Trail in the role of political commentator and the de facto editor of the Queenslander to January 1881. He succeeded William O'Carroll as Courier editor-in-chief from September 1883 to his death in October 1887. Lukin's roles as part owner-editor changed on 21 December 1880. Charles Hardie Buzacott (1835–1918), former 'Postmaster General' in the first McIlwraith government, had been a staff journalist. John James Knight (1863–1927) was editor-in-chief of the Brisbane Courier 1906–16, later managing director, then chairman of all the company's publications.

The first edition of The Courier-Mail was published on 28 August 1933, after Keith Murdoch's Herald and Weekly Times acquired and merged the Brisbane Courier and the Daily Mail (first published on 3 October 1903). In 1987, Rupert Murdoch's News Limited acquired newspaper control, and outstanding shares of Queensland Newspapers Pty Ltd.

The Courier-Mail was inducted into the Queensland Business Leaders Hall of Fame in 2015.

Political position
The Courier-Mail is a right leaning newspaper with four editorial endorsements for the Coalition to one for Labor in the period 1996–2007. The Courier-Mail generally supports free market economic policies and the process of globalisation. It supported the 2003 invasion of Iraq.

Circulation and readership

The Courier-Mail has the fourth-highest circulation of any daily newspaper in Australia. Its average Monday-Friday net paid print sales were 172,801 between January and March 2013, having fallen 8.0 per cent compared to the previous year. Its average Saturday net paid print sales were 228,650 between January and March 2013, down 10.5 per cent compared to the previous year.

The paper's Monday-Friday readership was 488,000 in March 2013, having fallen 11.6 per cent compared to the previous year. Its Saturday readership was 616,000 in March 2013, down 13.8 per cent compared to the previous year. Around three-quarters of the paper's readership is located in the Brisbane metropolitan area.

Although often claimed to be Brisbane's only daily newspaper since the demise of Queensland Newspapers' own afternoon newspaper The Telegraph in 1988, it arguably has had two competitors since 2007. News Corp itself published mX, a free afternoon newspaper, since 2007, but mX had a relatively low news content, and was discontinued in mid 2015. Fairfax Media has published the online only Brisbane Times since 2007.

According to third-party web analytics providers Alexa and SimilarWeb, Courier-Mail's website is the 141st and 273rd most visited in Australia respectively, as of August 2015. At the same time, SimilarWeb rated the site as the 25th most visited news website in Australia, attracting almost 2.6 million visitors per month.

Editors

The current editor is Chris Jones. Its editorial cartoonist is Sean Leahy. For thirty years, the paper's senior rugby league football journalist was former Australian vice-captain Jack Reardon.  Sports editor at The Courier Mail, Tom Linneth became the youngest editor in Australia in 1960 at the age of 29.  He worked at The Courier Mail between about 1948 to 1974 and again worked there as the sports editor between about 1982 until he retired in 1996.

 Jun 1846 – Dec 1847: Arthur Sidney Lyon (first editor)
 Dec 1847 – c. 1850: James Swan
 early to mid-1850s: William Wilks
 1859: Richard Belford (former editor of Ballarat Star and later editor of the North Australian)
 1859–1863: Theophilus Parsons Pugh (also the creator and publisher of Pugh's Almanac)
 1864–1866: David Frederick Tudor Jones
 1867–c. 1869: William O'Carroll
 1869–1873: George Hall ("the Bohemian")
 1873–1875: Gresley Lukin (assisted by William O'Carroll)
 1875 – Dec 1880: William O'Carroll (as the de facto editor, officially edited by the managing editor Gresley Lukin)
 Jan 1881– Sep 1883: William O'Carroll (as the de facto editor, although officially edited by the managing editor Charles Hardie Buzacott)
 Sep 1883 – Oct 1887: Carl Adolph Feilberg
 Oct 1887 – Dec 1887: Edmund John T Barton (later author of the Jubilee History of Queensland)
 Jan 1888 – Jun 1891: William Kinnaird Rose
 Jan 1894 – Nov 1898: Frederick William Ward
 Dec 1898 – Apr 1903: Charles Brunsdon Fletcher (son-in-law of Sir Arthur Rutledge) 
 April 1903 – 1906: Edmund John T Barton (later author of the Jubilee History of Queensland)
 1906 – Jun 1916: John James Knight
 Jun 1916 – Jun 1919: John MacGregor
 Jun 1919 – 1932?: R. Sanderson Taylor
 1932 – Dec 1933: Firman McKinnon
 Jan 1934 – Sep 1936: Reginald Tingey Foster (also Editor-in-Chief The Courier-Mail, The Sunday Mail, The Queenslander)
 late 1936 – 1938: Charles E Sligo (news editor, acting editor)
 Apr 1938 – late 1941: Jack C Waters (also Editor-in-Chief The Courier-Mail, The Sunday Mail, The Queenslander (to 1939))
 1942 – 1968: Theodor Charles Bray (later Sir Theodor) (after 1953 also Editor-in-Chief The Courier-Mail, The Sunday Mail)
 1968 – 1969: Alan F Cummins
 1969 – 1979: John R Atherton
 1979 – 1984: Kevin J Kavanagh
 Mar 1984 – Mar 1987: David C Smith (Feb 1986 – Mar 1987 also Editor-in-Chief The Courier-Mail, The Sunday Mail)
 Mar 1987 – Apr 1991: Greg Chamberlin
 Mar 1987 – Apr 1991: Ron Richards (managing editor)
 Apr 1991 – Apr 1995: Jack Lunn (Editor-in-Chief The Courier-Mail, The Sunday Mail)
 Apr 1991 – Apr 1995: Des Houghton
 Apr 1995 – Jun 2002: Chris Mitchell (also Editor-in-Chief The Courier-Mail, The Sunday Mail)
 Jun 2002 – Mar 2010: David Fagan (Mar 2010 – Editor-in-Chief The Courier-Mail, The Sunday Mail)
 Mar 2010 – June 2013: Michael Crutcher
 June 2013 – 2016: Chris Dore
 2016-2017: Lachlan Heywood
 2017-2019: Sam Weir
 2020-: Chris Jones

Change to tabloid

From its inception until March 2006 The Courier-Mail was a broadsheet newspaper. On 14 December 2005 it was announced that the paper would change to a tabloid sometime in early 2006, however the term "tabloid" was not used in favour of the term "compact". This linguistic choice was probably related to widespread public view that many tabloids, including those published by News Limited, were low quality publications (see tabloid for discussion of this size and quality issue). Much emphasis was made that it was merely the paper size that was changing and not the journalistic quality. The last broadsheet edition was published on Saturday 11 March 2006, and the first tabloid edition was published on Monday 13 March 2006. On the same day, the paper's website was revamped and expanded.

The change to a tabloid format brought The Courier-Mail in line with all other News Limited Australian metropolitan daily newspapers. This followed the change to a tabloid format by The Advertiser of Adelaide—another News Corporation newspaper—some years earlier. Despite the claims that there would be no loss of journalistic quality, The Courier-Mail in its "compact" format is not well regarded for its journalism, e.g. the 'Crikey' website described it as "one of the contestants in a close run field for worst paper in Australia". In August 2011, police and the parents of a murder victim criticised the paper for falsely accusing their son of a child sex crime.

On 24 March 2014 Queensland Newspapers, the News Corp Australia subsidiary responsible for publishing the Courier-Mail, was found guilty by a District Court of breaching restrictions on publishing Family Court proceedings on four occasions and fined a total of $120,000. The breaches occurred in 2012 when the Courier-Mail published on its front page the names and photos of a mother and her children involved in a Family Court dispute. District Court Justice Terence Martin said: "It seems to me that the newspaper seized upon what it regarded as a sensational story, which would be attractive to readers, and put the story ahead of its legal obligations".

Criticism
The Courier-Mail has been viewed as controversial on several occasions. One particular instance, on 7 October 2014, the paper published a transphobic headline related to the gruesome murder of Mayang Prasetyo. It also raised controversy for depicting Indonesian president Joko Widodo with a doctored photo of bloody hands to protest against the country's decision to execute two Australian convicted drug smugglers known as part of the Bali Nine.

Digitisation 
Pre-1955 issues of the newspaper have been digitised as part of the Australian Newspapers Digitisation Program  of the National Library of Australia.

See also

 The Sunday Mail
 List of newspapers in Australia

References

Further reading
 Brisbane Courier 29 January 1895, p2. "The Queenslander: New Series".
 Brisbane Courier 20 June 1896, p7a–8c. Jubilee Issue 1846 To 1896. "Half-a-Century of News Paper Work. A Chequered Career. Genesis of a Daily Paper. The Early Press of Queensland". by J. J. Knight.
 Brisbane Courier 22 June 1926 "Eightieth Birthday Number"
 Browne, Reginald Spencer: A Journalist’s Memories, Read Press, Brisbane 1927, 351 pages & index.
 Browne, Reginald Spencer: article in the Brisbane Courier of 26 August 1933, page 14–15. "Courier" Editors. Fifty Years With Them.
 Cryle, Denis: The Press In Colonial Queensland: A Social and Political History 1845–1875, Brisbane 1995, 191 pages.
 Davies, Alfred G.: "Queensland's Pioneer Journals and Journalists", Historical Society of Queensland Journal (RHSQ) vol 3, No 4, 1936–47, p265–283.
 Ørsted-Jensen: Robert: The Right To Live – the Politics of Race and the Troubled Conscience of an Australian Journalist (yet unpublished manuscript)

External links

 
 
 
 
 
The Courier-Mail digital stories and oral histories: Queensland Business Leaders Hall of Fame 2015, State Library of Queensland

Publications established in 1846
News Corp Australia
Newspapers published in Brisbane
Companies based in Brisbane
1846 establishments in Australia
Pre-Separation Queensland
Daily newspapers published in Australia
Newspapers on Trove
Conservative media